Cats on the Roof is a 2003 South Korean television series starring Kim Rae-won, Jeong Da-bin, Choi Jung-yoon and Lee Hyun-woo. It aired on MBC from June 2 to July 22, 2003 on Mondays and Tuesdays at 21:55 for 16 episodes.

A comedy with light touches of drama about friendship, love and cohabitation, the series is loosely based on an internet novel written by Kim Yu-ri. It was a hit, receiving an average viewership rating of 26.3% and a peak rating of 37.3%.

Overview
Kyung-min, a law student, is in desperate straits, so he decides to take it upon himself to help Hye-ryun's poor friend, Jung-eun. This is the beginning of an extremely volatile friendship that somehow ends with the two of them living together under one roof, or to be more specific, living in a room on top of the roof of an old building.

This romantic setting provides the backdrop for this unlikely love story. Kyung-min's bratty ways clashes with Jung-eun's simple living, as he steadily takes advantage of her kindness and good nature.

Synopsis
Kyung-min is an orphan who was raised by his grandparents. His parents died many years ago in an accident. Both his grandparents love him very much. His grandmother especially so and accords to everything he does. As a result, he is spoiled and immature. He is a law student and lives in his own apartment funded by his rich grandparents money. Kyung-min likes a girl called Hye-ryun who is also rich and studying law with him. Hye-ryun pays Kyung-min no attention.

Jung-eun comes from a humble background. Her father is a policeman and her mother a housewife. Jung-eun is self-proclaimed to be not very bright and has failed the employment examination repeatedly. As a result, it is difficult for her to find a job. However, she remains optimistic about her future.

One day, Jung-eun's family decides to move to another town, away from Seoul. Jung eun is shocked and disapproves of the idea, however, under the patriarchal society of Korea, she has no choice. She secretly rents an attic room in an old building, however, before she can pay the deposit her immature younger brother finds her bank account booklet and steals the hard-earned money she has earned from her daily paper deliveries. Jung-eun is outraged and worries that her desire to remain in Seoul is shattered.

Jung-eun and Hye-ryun are friends from high school. One day Jung-eun borrowed Hye-ryun's library card and used the university's library's facilities. She accidentally takes Kyung-min's seat and drools over his books while she slept, tired from studying. Kyung-min returns to his seat disgusted at her actions. Jung-eun apologises and leaves. Later, Kyung-min's friend accidentally takes his folder without informing Kyung-min. Kyung-min, believing that Jung-eun stole his folder, goes and chases Jung-eun down and demands she open her bag. Jung-eun defends herself by stating that she did not steal his folder. Their verbal disagreement turns in physical as Kyung-min grabs her bag and the contents are spilt out. Kyung-min realises his mistake and quickly gathers the things back in her bag. Jung-eun walks off in a huff.

Soon, Jung-eun returns Hye-ryun's card and they have lunch in the cafeteria. As they chat, this was incidentally seen by Kyung-min. Kyung-min forms an idea. A few days later, he sees Jung-eun in the University park and decides to befriend her in order for Jung-eun to whisper favorable words to Hye-ryun. Kyung-min deceptively slips that he is Hye-ryun's friends. Knowing this, Jung-eun reasons that since he is Hye-ryun's friend, then he can't be too harmful. Due to Kyung-min's regretful attitude, Jung-eun decides to trust Kyung-min and they become friends. As they get to know each other, Jung-eun pours out her finance woes to Kyung-min due to her brother's theft and the resulting inability to pay the deposit for the attic house. Kyung-min, keen to be nice to Jung-eun, lends his money to Jung-eun.

Cast
 Kim Rae-won as Lee Kyung-min
 Jeong Da-bin as Nam Jung-eun 
 Choi Jung-yoon as Na Hye-ryun 
 Lee Hyun-woo as Yoo Dong-joon 
 Jang Yong as Nam Sang-sik, Jung-eun's father
 Kim Ja-ok as Kim Soon-deok, Jung-eun's mother
 Bong Tae-gyu as Nam Jung-woo, Jung-eun's younger brother
 Kim Mu-saeng as Lee Pil-deuk, Kyung-min's grandfather
 Kang Boo-ja as Lee Kyung-hee, Kyung-min's grandmother
 Kim Chang-sook as Hye-ryun's mother
 Cha Joo-ik as Kyung-min's aunt
 Kim Tae-hyun as Joon-ho, Kyung-min's college friend
 Seo Hyun

Theatre adaptation
It was adapted into a stage play of the same title in 2010, with Lee Sun-ho and Hwang Bo-ra in the leading roles.

References

External links
  
 Cats on the Roof at MBC Global Media
 
 

2003 South Korean television series debuts
2003 South Korean television series endings
AZN Television original programming
Korean-language television shows
MBC TV television dramas
South Korean romantic comedy television series
Television shows based on South Korean novels